Kapedes is a village located in the Nicosia District of Cyprus.

References

Communities in Nicosia District